Ernst Jakob Oppert (5 December 1832 – 19 September 1903) was a Jewish businessman from Germany best known for his unsuccessful attempt in 1867 to remove the remains of the father of regent Yi Ha-eung from their grave in order to use them to blackmail the regent into removing Korean trade barriers.

Life
Oppert was born into a wealthy banker family in Hamburg. Two of his brothers, Julius and Gustav, became leading German orientalists, while Ernst opened a trading business in 1851 in Hong Kong. When that company went bankrupt in 1867, he became interested in trading with Korea, which at that time followed a strict isolationist policy and was a hermit kingdom, and a closed market to westerners. Oppert visited the country clandestinely several times. Although Oppert himself had no experience in learning the Korean language he judged the Korean language to be much harder to learn than either Chinese or Japanese. Oppert based this judgment on a scarcity of sources and in his opinion,

Prince Namyeon body snatching incident
Whilst in Shanghai, Oppert met a French priest named Féron, who had devised a plan to excavate and hold hostage the remains of the father of regent Yi Haeung, who ruled the country for his son, King Gojong, to use them to blackmail him into opening the country for trade. Supplied by an American, E. F. B. Jenkins, with money and arms, they set out on 30 April 1867. When they reached the tomb, they tried to steal the body, but were stopped by the massive stone slab that covered Prince Namyeon's remains and had to leave without having achieved their objective. That stone was thought to be steel, but it was in fact quicklime. On their way back, they were engaged by Korean soldiers in a battle and their party had to flee the country. The incident enraged the Koreans, who were now even less inclined to trade with the foreigners.

According to A. H. S. Landor, the tale of Oppert's unsuccessful tomb raiding was still well known in Korea around the end of the 19th century and was being told to foreigners on arriving, with one member of the raid party allegedly still living in Chemulpo.

Later life
Oppert returned to Germany, where he thereafter had an unremarkable businessman's life. Some sources claim that he spent a few months in jail for this grave robbing episode. In 1880 he published a book about Korea titled Ein verschlossenes Land. Reisen nach Corea. It was originally published by Brockhaus in Leipzig and was also translated into English.

See also
Germans in Korea

References

Works 
 Ein verschlossenes Land. - Brockhaus, Leipzig 1880 (Digital)

External links 
 Kneider, H.-A.: Ernst Jacob Oppert: Ein deutscher Kaufmann auf Raubzug im alten Korea, 2003. URL last accessed April 26, 2006.
 Jewish Encyclopedia: Oppert, Ernst Jacob. URL last accessed April 26, 2006.
 Neff, Robert: "German merchant's Bodysnatching Expedition in 1868," The Korea Times July 22, 2010, p. 15.

1832 births
1903 deaths
19th-century German businesspeople
Businesspeople from Hamburg
German expatriates in Korea
19th-century German Jews